The Canal de Pommerœul à Condé is a canal in northern France and southwestern Belgium. It leads from Pommerœul in Belgium to Condé-sur-l'Escaut in France. It is not in service. It is 5 km long and had 3 locks.

See also
List of canals in France

References

Pommeroeul